The awards of Certificate of Honour and Maharshi Badrayan Vyas Samman are Indian Presidential honours which are conferred on academics by the President of India once a year on the Indian Independence Day, celebrated on 15 August; in recognition of their substantial contribution in the various fields of languages including Arabic, Kannada, Sanskrit, Malayalam, Oriya, Pali, Persian, Prakrit and the Telugu language.

The awards come under the umbrella of the language division of the Ministry of Education's Department of Higher Education. The award takes its name from Bādarāyaṇa, the founder of the Vedanta system of Philosophy, who wrote the Vedāntasūtra k.a. Brahmasūtra.

Introductory years
The Certificate of Honour for Arabic Persian and Sanskrit languages were introduced in 1958 and certificates for Pali and Prakrit were introduced in 1966. 

The Maharshi Badrayan Vyas Samman award was introduced in the 2002 for Arabic Persian and Sanskrit and also for Pali and  Prakrit languages. Since the year 2016, both the Certificate of Honourand and the Maharshi Badrayan Vyas Samman have been conferred upon scholars of classical Kannada, classical Malayalam, classical Oriya and  the classical Telugu language.

Age criteria and content of award
The Certificate of Honour-i is awarded to selected Indian scholars having an age of 60 years or above. It honour includes a certificate, a memento and one time cash of five hundred thousand Indian rupees. The Certificate of Honour-ii is awarded to selected scholars Overseas Indians and foreigners of non-Indian origin, who aged 60 years or above. The award constitutes a certificate, a memento and one time cash of five hundred thousand Indian rupees.

The Maharshi Badrayan Vyas Samman is conferred upon selected young scholars aged between 30 and 45. It constituted a certificate of honour, a memento and a one time cash of one hundred thousand Indian rupees.

For classical Tamil
The awards for classical Tamil is provided by President of India separately every year. It was introduced in 2005, and is managed by the Central Institute of Classical Tamil, an autonomous institution under the language division of Ministry of Education's Department of Higher Education. These awards have certain distinctions:

 Tholkāppiyar Award (equivalent to Certificate of Honour-i)
 Kural Peedam Award (equivalent to Certificate of Honour-ii)
 Young Scholar Award (equivalent to Maharshi Badrayan Vyas Samman - age limit: 30–40 years)

Recipients

Certificate of Honour

2019

Sanskrit
 Sripada Satyanarayanamurthy
 Rajendra Nath Sarma
 Ramji Thakur
 Chand Kiran Saluja
 ShriKrishan Sharma
 V. Ramakrishna Bhatt
 Vidwan Janardana Hegde
 Kala Acharya
 Harekrishna Satapathy
 Pandit Satya Dev Sharma
 Shri Banwari Lal Gaur
 V.S. Karunakaran
 Yugal Kishor Mishra
 Manudev Bhattacharya
 Subuddhi Charan Goswami

Pali
 Uma Shankar Vyas

Prakrit
 Kamal Chand Sogani

Arabic
 Faizanullah Farooqi
 Mohammad Iqbal Husain
 Mohd. Samiullah Khan

Persian
 Iraq Raza Zaidi
 Chander Shekhar
 Mohammad Sidiq Niazmand

Classical Kannada
 Hampa Nagarajaiah

Classical Telugu
 Ravva Srihari

Classical Malayalam
 C.P. Achuthan Unny

Classical Odia
 Antaryami Mishra

Maharshi Badrayan Vyas Samman

2012

Sanskrit
Sampadananda Mishra
Chandra Bhushan Jha
Malihar Arvind Kulkarni
Narayan Dash
Sasibhushan Mishra

Persian
Asad Ali Khurshid

2013

Sanskrit
Balram Shukla

2019

Sanskrit
 Ashok Thapliyal
 Sujata Tripathi
 Sanju Mishra
 Abhijit Hanmant Joshi
 Sharachchandra Dwivedi

Pali
Ms. Anoma Shriram Sakhare

Prakrit
 Ashish Kumar Jain

Arabic
 Fauzan Ahmad

Persian
 M. Shahbaz Alam

Classical Kannada
 G.B. Harisha
 S. Karthik
 M. Byrappa

Classical Telugu
 Addanki Srinivas
 V. Triveni
 D.K. Prabhakar

Classical Malayalam
 Rajeev R.R.
 Santhosh Thottingal

Classical Odia
 Subrat Kumar Prusty

References

Indian literary awards